Kuch Pyar Ka Pagalpan (English – Once Was a Some Madness of Love) is a Pakistani television serial, written by Samira Fazal, directed by Haissam Hussain, broadcast on the ARY Digital network in Pakistan.

It is also selected by TV Channel Zindagi (India) and running from 1 February 2016 every Monday to Saturday Prime time slot 8 pm under the title Kuch Pyaar Ka Paagalpan Bhi Tha.

Plot 
Mujtaba, a local guy from Iqbal Town, Lahore moves to UK, where he lives with his uncle, in the hope of a better quality of life and fulfillment of his dreams. The reality proves to be bitter.

Since his childhood, Mujtaba had been inclined towards his uncle's daughter, Danize, who turns out to be an arrogant snob on his arrival in UK. Danize has an excellent understanding with Shamraiz since childhood, and both of them treat Mujtaba as a stupid churl.

They plan a conspiracy against Mujtaba, as a result of which his uncle throws him out of his house. Then, a girl named Kiran, who has almost no understanding with any one within her family, arrives in his life.

Cast

Main cast 

 Fawad Khan as Mujtaba
 Sanam Baloch as Kiran
 Ayesha Khan as Danize Taimoor
 Mikaal Zulfiqar as Shamraiz

Other cast members 

 Tashiqa Shah 
 Azra Mohyeddin as Mujtaba's mother
 Mujtaba Khan
 Hashim Butt as Mujtaba's father
 Farah Tufail
 Laila Zuberi
 Sana Humayun
 Khalid Butt
 Ayesha Khan as Ubaida
 Naeem Tahir as Taimoor 
 Tahira Bhatti

Soundtrack
The Official Sound Track of the drama serial has been composed by Waqar Ali and the lyrics were written by Sabir Zafar. The title song Kuch Pyar Ka Pagalpan Bhi Tha has been sung by Rahat Fateh Ali Khan

References

External links

Kuch Pyar Ka Pagalpan on MX Player
Kuch Pyar Ka Pagalpan on Eros Now
	

2011 Pakistani television series debuts
ARY Digital original programming
Pakistani drama television series
Urdu-language telenovelas
2012 Pakistani television series endings